Calathus vuillefroyi is a species of ground beetle from the Platyninae subfamily that is endemic to Spain.

References

vuillefroyi
Beetles described in 1867
Endemic fauna of Spain
Beetles of Europe